The Fayetteville metropolitan area may refer to:

The Fayetteville, Arkansas metropolitan area, United States
The Fayetteville, North Carolina metropolitan area, United States
The Fayetteville, Florida metropolitan area, United States

See also
Fayetteville (disambiguation)